Government Kolasib College is an undergraduate college of Mizoram state in India located at Kolasib. It is a coeducation institute governed by the Directorate of Higher & Technical Education, Education & Human Resources Department, Government of Mizoram. It is affiliated to the Mizoram University, a central university under University Grants Commission of India. Established in 1978, it is nationally recognised under 2(f) and 12-B of the U.G.C. Act, 1956.

Kolasib College is a branch institute of the Mizoram College Teachers' Association.

History

Kolasib College is the first and only recognised college in Kolasib district. It was established on public demand. A public meeting was held on 10 October 1977 for starting higher education in Kolasib. An ad hoc committee was created under the leadership of Vanlalngaia, as the Chairman, and F. Hrangchhuana, as the Secretary. A complete Governing Body was established on 13 January 1978. With public donation, a college named "Kolasib College" was inaugurated on 19 July 1978 as a private institute. The first staff were recruited on 28 October 1977. The first pre-university classes were conducted at Kolasib High School. The first batch consisted of 131 students, who appeared for university examination in 1979 after affiliation to the North Eastern Hill University. In 1908, the college was conducted at Kolasib Middle School. Underdraguate courses were opened in 1981. In 1981, NEHU approved its undergraduate course. In 1982, it was given official recognition by the state government. The government allotted a separate campus, and with new buildings, it was occupied in 1983. The Government of Mizoram recognised it as a semi-governmental institute (the status called deficit college) in 1985. In 1987, science courses were started. It became a fully governmental college under the Mizoram Provincialization Rules from 31 January 1992, and it was renamed Government Kolasib College. It was fully approved by UGC in 1992. With the establishment of Mizoram University in 2000, its affiliation was automatically transferred to the new university.

Courses

Kolasib College is a multidisciplinary institute offering courses in arts, science, and computer science. There are eight subjects in arts, namely, English, Economics, Education, Geography, History, Mizo, Political Science, and Public Administration. There four in science, such as Botany, Chemistry, Mathematics, Physics, and Zoology. Computer science is opened as Bachelor of Computer Application (BCA). In addition, there are distant-learning courses under its IGNOU centre.

Research

Kolasib College is conducting two UGC-funded major research projects from 2014. "Study of photofield emission by using the projectin-operation method of group theory and band structure calculations" is in the Department of Physics, and "Hydro-geochemistry of Tuichhuahen River - the main source of supply water for Kolasib and Bilkhawthlir towns of Mizoram" is in the Department of Chemistry.

See also
Education in India
Education in Mizoram
Mizoram University
Literacy in India

References

External links 
 Kolasib College

Universities and colleges in Mizoram
Colleges affiliated to Mizoram University
Kolasib district